The Royal Galician Academy (RAG) is an institution dedicated to the study of Galician culture and especially the Galician language; it promulgates norms of grammar, spelling, and vocabulary and works to promote the language. The Academy is based in A Coruña, Galicia, Spain. The incumbent president, since 2017, is Víctor Fernández Freixanes.

History 
The Sociedade Protectora da Academia Gallega was founded in La Habana, Cuba in 1905. The following year, thanks to the efforts of writers Manuel Curros Enríquez and Xosé Fontenla Leal, on 30 September 1906, it was reestablished as the Real Academia Galega, with Manuel Murguía as its first president.

In 1972 the Academy standardized the design of the coat of arms of the Kingdom of Galicia. Some years later, the Academy persuaded the Galician government to commemorate the old coat of arms by superimposing it on the existing civil flag; the resulting flag is used today. Its terminological branch is Termigal.

Current members 
 Víctor Fernández Freixanes
 Margarita Ledo Andión
 Fina Casalderrey
 Marilar Aleixandre
 Xosé Henrique Monteagudo Romero
 Xesús Alonso Montero
 Rosario Álvarez Blanco
 Xosé Luís Axeitos Agrelo
 Ana Isabel Boullón Agrelo
 Francisco Díaz-Fierros Viqueira
 Francisco Fernández Rei
 Xesús Ferro Ruibal
 Salvador García-Bodaño Zunzunegui
 Manuel González González
 Bernardino Graña Villar
 María López Sández
 Ramón Lorenzo Vázquez
 Chus Pato
 Xosé Luís Regueira Fernández
 Manuel Rivas
 Euloxio Rodríguez Ruibal
 Ana Romaní
 Pegerto Saavedra Fernández
 Anton Luís Santamarina Fernández
 Andrés Torres Queiruga
 Ramón Villares Paz

References

External links 
 

 
Galician language
Language regulators
1905 establishments in Cuba